Here It Is is the sixth studio album by American singer Freddie Jackson. It was released by RCA Records on January 18, 1994. His debut with the label after several years with Capitol Records, it reached number 11 on the US Top R&B/Hip-Hop Albums. Here It Is produced the singles "Come Home II U", "I Love" and "My Family".

Critical reception

AllMusic editor Ron Wynn found that Jackson's debut with RCA "has several excellent performances, but unfortunately, there's no single standout cut. There are brilliantly sung numbers, ("Come Home II U," "I Love," "My Family") but there's no track that can stand alongside "Rock Me Tonight," "Nice And Slow" or any of a half-dozen other past Jackson hits. Jackson merits pop attention more than many others with a much larger profile."

Track listing

Personnel and credits 
Musicians

 Freddie Jackson – lead and backing vocals 
 Christian Warren – multi instruments (1, 8), backing vocals (1, 8)
 Maurice Wilcher – multi instruments (2), backing vocals (2), arrangements (2)
 Paul Laurence – multi instruments (3, 5, 6, 7), backing vocals (3, 5, 6, 7)
 Lathun Grady – keyboards (4, 10), programming (4, 10), drum programming (4, 10), backing vocals (4, 10)
 Charles "Charva" Norris – keyboards (4, 10), programming (4, 10), drum programming (4, 10)
 Kyle West – multi instruments (9)
 Lillo Thomas – backing vocals (3)
 Audrey Wheeler – backing vocals (6, 7)
 Antoine Foote – backing vocals (8)

Production

 Christian Warren – producer (1, 8), engineer (1, 8)
 Maurice Wilcher – producer (2)
 Paul Laurence – producer (3, 5, 6, 7)
 Lathun Grady – producer (4, 10)
 Charles "Charva" Norris – producer (4, 10)
 Kyle West – producer (9), mix assistant (9)
 Beau Huggins – executive producer 
 Skip Miller – executive producer 
 Louis Alfred III – engineer (1, 8), assistant engineer (3-7, 9, 10), mix assistant (4, 9, 10)
 Hilary Bercovici – engineer (1, 8)
 Darkroom Productions – mixing (1, 8)
 Steve Wachman – engineer (2)
 Michael Tarisa – mixing (2)
 Ron Banks – engineer (3-7, 9, 10), mixing (3-7, 9, 10)
 Greg Kutcher – engineer (4)
 Paul Logus – engineer (9)
 Jim Michewicz – engineer (10)
 Brandon Harris – mix assistant (1)
 Doug Wilson – assistant engineer (2)
 Joe Davi – assistant engineer (3, 5, 6, 7)
 Ed Miller – assistant engineer (9)
 Tony Dawsey – mastering 
 Alison Ball-Gabriel – A&R direction
 Paul Biagas – A&R administration, project coordinator 
 Laurie Gonzalez – project coordinator 
 Anne Thomas – album coordinator 
 Joel Sylvain – assistant album coordinator 
 Tracey Richards – assistant album coordinator 
 Ria Lewerke – art direction 
 Norman Moore – design 
 Timothy White – photography 
 Jackie Reinhart – photo coordinator
 Pat Collins – imaging 
 Bernard Jacobs – stylist 
 Dennis Mitchell – hair stylist 
 Charles Huggins – manager
 Hush Productions, Inc. – management company 

Studios
 Recorded at The Hit Factory, Unique Recording Studios and 111 Sound/Stage (New York, NY); Sigma Sound Studios (Philadelphia, PA); The Pit (Reseda, CA); The Disc Ltd. (East Point, MI).
 Mixed at The Hit Factory (New York, NY) and Record Plant (Hollywood, CA).
 Mastered at Masterdisk (New York, NY).

Charts

References

External links
 Here It Is at Discogs.

1994 albums
Freddie Jackson albums
RCA Records albums